The  is a large mountainous peninsula with a deeply indented coastline to the west of Tokyo on the Pacific coast of the island of Honshu, Japan. Formerly known as Izu Province, Izu peninsula is now a part of Shizuoka Prefecture. The peninsula’s populated areas are located primarily on the north and east.

Geology
Tectonically, the Izu peninsula results from the Philippine Sea Plate colliding with the Okhotsk Plate at the Nankai Trough. The Philippine Sea Plate, the Amurian Plate, and the Okhotsk Plate meet at Mount Fuji, a triple junction.  The peninsula itself lies on the Philippine Sea Plate.

The southern portion of the peninsula is composed largely of breccia, and the central and northern portions consist of numerous highly eroded volcanoes. The Amagi Mountain Range dominates the center of the peninsula with Mount Amagi and Mount Atami in the east and Mount Daruma in the west, with the eastern and western portions of the range extending underwater into Sagami Bay and Suruga Bay.  The peninsula's major river, the Kano River in the north, flows through a graben valley created by plate tectonics.

As a result of its underlying geology, the peninsula is prone to frequent earthquake swarms and tsunamis, and it abounds in hot springs.

Administration
All of Izu Peninsula is within Shizuoka Prefecture.  It is administratively divided into eight cities and five towns:

 Atami
 Itō
 Izu
 Izunokuni
 Mishima
 Shimoda
 Kamo District
 Higashiizu
 Kawazu
 Matsuzaki
 Minamiizu
 Nishiizu

Economics

A popular resort region for tourists from the Kantō region, the Izu peninsula is primarily known for onsen hot spring resorts in Atami, Shuzenji, and Itō.  The area is also popular for sea bathing, surfing, golfing and motorcycle touring.  The peninsula abuts Mount Fuji and is a part of Fuji-Hakone-Izu National Park.  

The southwest coast of Izu, from the municipalities of Matsuzaki, Nishiizu and Minamiizu was designated a National Place of Scenic Beauty in 1937.

Aside from tourism, agriculture and fishing are the mainstays of the local economy. Izu is one of the biggest producers of wasabi in Japan, and the local cuisine offers dishes flavored with wasabi.  Nevertheless, these industries are not lucrative enough to prevent a heavy loss of population to Greater Tokyo and Shizuoka, particularly among the young.

Access

Railway

The northern parts of Izu peninsula is easily accessible from Tokyo and points west via the Tōkaidō Shinkansen, which has stations in both Atami in the northeast and Mishima in the northwest.  JR Itō Line and the Izu Kyūkō Line provides service along the east coast of the peninsula to Shimoda, however given the lack of population, these services are less regular.

Central Izu is served by the Sunzu Line as far as Shuzenji. The west coast of the peninsula is less developed, and has no train service.

Roadway
Izu Peninsula is served by numerous expressways.
To get to the eastern side, a branch at Atsugi leads to the Odawara-Atsugi Road, which continues past Odawara to Yugawara, Atami, and Shimoda. Izu Peninsula is also served by Japan National Route 135, Japan National Route 136, and Japan National Route 414. Izu also offers two scenic roads, called "Izu Skyline" (伊豆スカイライン) and "Western Izu Skyline" (西伊豆スカイライン）that offer beautiful views on nature and Mt. Fuji. Both skyline roads are favorite spots of car and motorcycle enthusiasts.

The Odakyu Electric Railway runs local bus services from Odawara and Hakone, and there is an extensive but infrequent internal bus network.

Airway
On August 12, 1985, Flight JAL 123, while crossing peninsular airspace, experienced an explosion in the aft pressure bulkhead, resulting in an accident that killed 520 people, becoming one of the deadliest air disasters in human history.

See also
List of Places of Scenic Beauty of Japan (Shizuoka)

References

External links
Izu Peninsula Geopark
Izu Peninsula - Encyclopædia Britannica'' Online
Eastern Area (Izu) - Shizuoka Guide (Shizuoka Prefectural Tourism Association)
Izu Peninsula, Shizuoka - Japan National Tourist Organization

Peninsulas of Japan
Izu–Bonin–Mariana Arc
Landforms of Shizuoka Prefecture
Places of Scenic Beauty